If You Can't Beat 'Em, Join 'Em! is an album by American jazz saxophonist Gerry Mulligan featuring performances recorded in 1965 and first released on the Limelight label.

Reception

AllMusic awarded the album 3 stars and its review by Ken Dryen states, "Many jazz musicians were frustrated with the public's focus on rock & roll and pop music in general at the time this recording was made. So Mulligan, like many other jazzmen, decided to take a few of the hits and recast them in a jazz setting. ...of borderline interest to serious fans of Gerry Mulligan, due to the uneven material and a supporting cast that is not up to the level one expects on the baritone saxophonist's records".

Track listing
 "King of the Road" (Roger Miller) - 2:32 	
 "Engine, Engine No. 9" (Miller) - 3:53 	
 "Hush, Hush, Sweet Charlotte" (Frank De Vol, Mack David) - 4:02 	
 "I Know a Place" (Tony Hatch) - 3:25 	
 "Can't Buy Me Love" (John Lennon, Paul McCartney) - 3:34 	
 "A Hard Day's Night" (Lennon, McCartney) - 3:51 	
 "If I Fell" (Lennon, McCartney) - 3:12 	
 "Downtown" (Hatch) - 2:30 	
 "Mr. Tambourine Man" (Bob Dylan) - 3:17 	
 "If You Can't Beat 'em, Join 'em" (Gerry Mulligan) - 3:30

Personnel
Gerry Mulligan - baritone saxophone
Pete Jolly - piano
Johnny Gray - guitar 
Jimmy Bond - bass
Hal Blaine - drums

References

Gerry Mulligan albums
1965 albums
Limelight Records albums